The 1939–40 Illinois Fighting Illini men's basketball team represented the University of Illinois.

Regular season
Doug Mills entered his fourth year as the head coach of the Fighting Illini with high hopes as well as a player with national prominence. William "Bill" Hapac was the program's first consensus first-team All-American as recognized by the NCAA. During the 1939-40 season, he became the first-ever recipient of the University of Illinois Athlete of the Year award. Hapac set the Big Ten single-game scoring record on February 10, 1940, with 34 points vs. Minnesota, a point total unheard of at that time. In addition to his success on the hardwood, Hapac also was a three-year letterwinner for the Illini baseball team. During the season, the Illini won 10 of their 11 home games only losing to conference rival Purdue in the last game of the season.  Unfortunately for the Illini they finished with a 4-5 record on the road to finish in a fourth place tie overall in conference action.  Mills' team featured 9 returning letterman including team captain William Hapac. The Illini also featured a starting lineup of John Drish at the center position and Harold Shapiro, Joe Frank, and William Hapac at forward and Victor Wukovits and future major league baseball player Walter Evers at the guard spot.

Roster

Source

Schedule

|-	
!colspan=12 style="background:#DF4E38; color:white;"| Non-Conference regular season

|- align="center" bgcolor=""

|-
!colspan=9 style="background:#DF4E38; color:#FFFFFF;"|Big Ten regular season

Bold Italic connotes conference game
												
Source

Player stats

Awards and honors
 William Hapac
Helms 1st team All-American (Consensus)
Converse 1st team All-American

References

Illinois Fighting Illini
Illinois Fighting Illini men's basketball seasons
1939 in sports in Illinois
1940 in sports in Illinois